Perovo is a former settlement in the Municipality of Kamnik in central Slovenia. It is now part of the town of Kamnik. The area is part of the traditional region of Upper Carniola. The municipality is now included in the Central Slovenia Statistical Region.

Geography

Perovo lies south of Kamnik, between Zaprice and Bakovnik. The settlement is divided into two parts. The main settlement, Spodnje Perovo ('lower Perovo') lies along the right bank of the Kamnik Bistrica River. A smaller hamlet, Zgornje Perovo ('upper Perovo'), lies to the southeast on the other side of the river, on a hillside where the headwaters of Krajček Creek flow.

The Titan Industrial Channel was dug parallel to the Kamnik Bistrica in 1920 to power the Titan Hydroelectric Plant.

Name
Perovo was mentioned in historical sources as Perau prope Stein in 1241.

History
Perovo was annexed by Kamnik in 1934, ending its existence as an independent settlement.

Perovo manors

Spodnje Perovo Manor—also known as Janežič Manor, Perau Manor, or Rasp Manor—stands in the northwest part of Spodnje Perovo. It was built by the Rasp family in the first half of the 17th century at the site of a medieval manor, and it has been remodeled several times since then. It is an L-shaped two-story structure that preserves Baroque architectural elements, including the door casing and window frames.

Zgornje Perovo Manor—also known as Šmolc Manor, Oberperau Manor, or Tomšič Manor—stands across the river from Spodnje Perovo Manor in the hamlet of Zgornje Perovo. It is a two-story building dating from the 15th century. The windows on the ground floor preserve Gothic elements, and those on the upper floor have Baroque elements.

Notable people
Notable people that were born or lived in Perovo include the following:
 France Lombergar (1928–1993), agronomist and orchard specialist

References

External links

Perovo on Geopedia

Populated places in the Municipality of Kamnik
Former settlements in Slovenia